|}

The Northumberland Plate is a flat handicap horse race in Great Britain open to horses aged three years or older. It is run at Newcastle over a distance of 2 miles and 56 yards (3,270 metres), and it is scheduled to take place each year in late June or early July.

History
The event was established in 1833, and the inaugural running was won by Tomboy. It was initially held at Town Moor, and it was part of a meeting first staged at Killingworth in 1623. It was transferred to its present venue at Gosforth Park in 1882.

The Northumberland Plate originally took place on a Wednesday, and for many years the meeting was a holiday for local mine workers. The race became popularly known as the "Pitmen's Derby". The meeting ceased to be a holiday in 1949, and the race was switched to a Saturday in 1952.

The Northumberland Plate is now one of the richest two-mile handicaps in the world. It was sponsored by John Smith's from 2003 to 2016, by Stobart Rail Limited in 2017 and 2018 and by Betfair since 2019.

Since 2016, it has been run on an artificial all-weather surface, Tapeta, having previously been run on turf.

Records
Most successful horse (3 wins):
 Underhand – 1857, 1858, 1859

Leading jockey since 1985 (2 wins):
 Willie Carson – Al Maheb (1990), Celeric (1996)
 Kevin Darley – Far Cry (1999), Bay of Islands (2000)

Leading trainer since 1985 (3 wins):
 Paul Cole – Windsor Castle (1997), Cyrian (1998), Archduke Ferdinand (2001)

Winners since 1985
 Weights given in stones and pounds.

Earlier winners

 1833: Tomboy
 1834: Fanny
 1835: Satan
 1836: Cyprian
 1837: Wedge
 1838: St Bennet
 1839: St Bennet
 1840: Hetman Platoff
 1841: Calypso
 1842: Heslington
 1843: Moss Trooper
 1844: The Era
 1845: Inheritress
 1846: Dolo
 1847: Eryx
 1848: Chanticleer
 1849: John Cosser
 1850: Elthiron
 1851: Neasham
 1852: Stilton
 1853: Kingston
 1854: Grapeshot
 1855: Whitelock
 1856: Zeta
 1857: Underhand
 1858: Underhand
 1859: Underhand
 1860: First Lord
 1861: Joey Jones
 1862: Montebello
 1863: Caller Ou
 1864: Caller Ou
 1865: Brown Bread
 1866: Rococo
 1867: Fervacques
 1868: Fortunio
 1869: The Spy
 1870: Kennington
 1871: Taraban
 1872: Spennithorne
 1873: Falkland
 1874: Lily Agnes
 1875: Harriet Laws
 1876: The Snail
 1877: Hampton
 1878: Glastonbury
 1879: Clearhead
 1880: Mycenae
 1881: Bonnie Doon
 1882: Victor Emanuel
 1883: Barcaldine
 1884: Lawminster
 1885: Blue Grass
 1886: Stone Clink
 1887: Exmoor
 1888: Matin Bell
 1889: Drizzle
 1890: Houndsditch
 1891: Queen's Birthday
 1892: Newcourt
 1893: Seaton Delaval
 1894: Newcourt
 1895: The Docker
 1896: Dare Devil
 1897: Bradwardine
 1898: King Crow
 1899: Sherburn
 1900: Joe Chamberlain
 1901: Reminiscence
 1902: Osbech
 1903: Cliftonhall
 1904: Palmy Days
 1905: Princess Florizel
 1906: Outbreak
 1907: Killigrew
 1908: Old China
 1909: Sir Harry
 1910: Elizabetta
 1911: Pillo
 1912: Mynora
 1913: The Tylt
 1914: The Guller
 1915–18: no race
 1919: Trestle
 1920: Irish Lake
 1921: Hunt Law
 1922: Double Hackle
 1923: Carpathus
 1924: Jazz Band
 1925: Obliterate
 1926: Foxlaw
 1927: Border Minstrel
 1928: Primrose League
 1929: Ballynahinch
 1930: Show Girl
 1931: Blue Vision
 1932: Pommarel
 1933: Leonard
 1934: White Plains
 1935: Doreen Jane
 1936: Coup de Roi
 1937: Nectar
 1938: Union Jack
 1939: Oracion
 1940–45: no race
 1946: Gusty *
 1947: Culrain
 1948: Pappatea
 1949: Fol Ami
 1950: Light Cavalry
 1951: Sycomore II
 1952: Souepi
 1953: Nick La Rocca
 1954: Friseur
 1955: Little Cloud
 1956: 
 1957: Great Rock
 1958: Master of Arts
 1959: Cannebiere
 1960: New Brig
 1961: Utrillo
 1962: Bordone
 1963: Horse Radish
 1964: Peter Piper
 1965: Cagirama
 1966: Sweet Story
 1967: Piaco
 1968: Amateur
 1969: Even Say
 1970: Philoctetes
 1971: Tartar Prince
 1972: Scoria
 1973: Tom Cribb
 1974: Attivo
 1975: Grey God
 1976: Philominsky
 1977: Tug of War
 1978: Tug of War
 1979: Totowah
 1980: Mon's Beau
 1981: Dawn Johnny
 1982: no race
 1983: Weavers Pin
 1984: Karadar

* The 1946 running took place at Aintree.

See also
 Horse racing in Great Britain
 List of British flat horse races

References

 Racing Post:
 galopp-sieger.de – Northumberland Plate.
 pedigreequery.com – Northumberland Plate – Newcastle.

Flat races in Great Britain
Newcastle Racecourse
Open long distance horse races
Recurring sporting events established in 1833
Sport in Newcastle upon Tyne
1833 establishments in England